Homag-e Pain (also Romanized as Homāg-e Pā’īn; also known as Homāk-e Pā’īn, Homā-ye Pā’īn, and Homay Sofla) is a village in Siyahu Rural District, Fin District, Bandar Abbas County, Hormozgan Province, Iran. At the 2006 census, its population was 482, in 114 families.

References 

Populated places in Bandar Abbas County